John Woollam may refer to:
John Woollam (physicist), American physicist
John Woollam (politician) (1927–2006), British politician